Mahmudabad-e Sofla may refer to:
 Mahmudabad-e Sofla, Fars
 Mahmudabad-e Sofla, Razavi Khorasan
 Mahmudabad-e Sofla, West Azerbaijan